Coaling is a town in Tuscaloosa County, Alabama, United States. It incorporated in September 1997. At the 2020 census, the population was 2,035. It is part of the Tuscaloosa, Alabama Metropolitan Statistical Area.

History
 On April 27, 2011, parts of Coaling were devastated by an EF-3 tornado at approximately 5:15 a.m. Three homes were completely destroyed, at least ten others were severely damaged, and twice as many more sustained light damage. Though there were no fatalities, some residents were hospitalized for injuries.

Geography
Coaling is located at  (33.169442, -87.345859).

Government
The city employs three police officers.

Demographics

Coaling first appeared on the 1880 U.S. Census as the village of Coaling Station. It did not appear again as a separate community on the census until 2000 after its incorporation in 1997.

As of the census of 2010, there were 1,657 people, 429 households, and 335 families residing in the city. The racial makeup of the city was 86.42% White, 11.40% Black or African American, 0.06% Native American, 0.50% from other races, and 0.81% from two or more races. 1.68% of the population were Hispanic or Latino of any race.

Out of the 429 households, 38.5% had children under the age of 18 living with them, 64.3% were married couples living together, 10.5% had a female householder with no husband present, and 21.7% were non-families. 18.9% of all households were made up of individuals, and 6.8% had someone living alone who was 65 years of age or older. The average household size was 2.60 and the average family size was 2.97.

In the city the population was spread out, with 71.57% under the age of 18, 4.58% from 20 - 24, 15.63% from 25 - 34, 22.57% from 35 - 49, 19.25% from 50 - 64 and 6.94% who were 65 years of age or older. The median age was 35 years. For every 100 males there were 98.3 males. For every 100 females age 18 and over, there were 88.7 males.

The median income for a household in the city was $45,662, and the median income for a family was $55,125. Males had a median income of $31,371 versus $21,394 for females. The per capita income for the city was $18,664. None of the families and 1.4% of the population were living below the poverty line, including no under eighteens and 15.9% of those over 64.

References

Towns in Alabama
Towns in Tuscaloosa County, Alabama
Tuscaloosa, Alabama metropolitan area